British post offices in Crete provided the postal service in the territory of the island of Crete. Stamps inscribed in Greek were used in the British sphere of administration (Heraklion) during the Great Powers occupation of the island in 1898–1899.

Postal history 
In 1898 Crete obtained autonomy under Ottoman suzerainty. The Cretan State was under international guarantee and protection; after the departure of the Ottoman garrison, it was garrisoned by an international military force from Britain, France, Italy and Russia and every force controlled one district.

British post offices were established by the military administration in the district under British control, but they never operated. They were in Heraklion and in 9 villages. The postmarks are HPAKΛEION, AΓ. ΘΩMAΣ, AΓ. MYPON, APXANAIΣ, EΠIΣKOΠH, KAΣΤΈΛΛΊ, MOIPAIΣ, MOXOΣ, XAPAKAΣ and XEPΣONHΣOΣ.

Stamp issues 
Britain issued 5 postage stamps inscribed in Greek. The stamps had face values in Ottoman Turkish  paras (1 piastre = 40 paras) using the word ΠAPAΔEΣ. The first one - a hand struck issue - is shown on the picture above. Also in 1898 followed a 10 Parades blue and a 20 Parades green and in 1899 a 10 Parades brown and a  20 Parades red, all lithographic issues.

Former it was thought, that Mail was forwarded via the Austrian office at Heraklion with an Austrian CANDIA postmark, because very few surviving envelopes and some British stamps bear the postmarks of both the British agencies and the Austrian post office in CANDIA. But nearly all Mail from British people bears only Austrian stamps. There is therefore no proof, that the British stamps had international validity or that there was a British postal service in Crete. So full sheets of Nos. 2 - 5 have been pre-cancelled with the HPAKEION postmark. Nevertheless, the rare franked covers and the stamps itself remain attractive for the collectors.

See also

References

External links 
 

Postal history of the United Kingdom
Cretan State
Philately of Greece
Postage stamps of Crete
Crete
Establishments in the Cretan State
1899 disestablishments